Champigny may refer to several communes in France:

Champigny, Marne
Champigny, Yonne
Champigny-en-Beauce, in the Loir-et-Cher département
Champigny-la-Futelaye, in the Eure département
Champigny-le-Sec, in the Vienne département
Champigny-lès-Langres, in the Haute-Marne département
Champigny-sous-Varennes, in the Haute-Marne département
Champigny-sur-Aube, in the Aube département
Champigny-sur-Marne, in the Val-de-Marne département
Champigny-sur-Veude, in the Indre-et-Loire département

See also  
 Collège de Champigny in Quebec, Canada
 Campigny (disambiguation)
 Souzay-Champigny, Maine-et-Loire department, France